Northolt Park railway station is a National Rail station in Northolt, Greater London. It is in Cadogan Close and spans the boundary between the London Borough of Harrow and the London Borough of Ealing, with a footbridge connecting the north side (leading to Roxeth and South Harrow) to the south side (leading to Northolt and Greenford).

The service to the station has much improved (until the late 1990s only peak hour trains stopped there)

History
The Great Central Railway line to High Wycombe from Marylebone opened in 1906 but this station (originally known as South Harrow and Roxeth) was not opened until 1926, being given its current name in 1929.

Services
The off-peak service on all days in trains per hour (tph) is:
 1 tph to London Marylebone
 1 tph to

Connections
London Buses routes 140, 395, 398, 487, X140 and N140 serve the station.

References

External links

 Chiltern Railways page for Northolt Park station
    Images of Northolt Park
  Google Street View

Railway stations in the London Borough of Ealing
Former London and North Eastern Railway stations
Railway stations in Great Britain opened in 1926
Railway stations served by Chiltern Railways
Northolt